= Rafsaqah =

Coordinates: 14°45′N 49°38′E

- Interactive map of Rafsaqah
- Country: Yemen
- Governorate: Hadhramaut
- Time zone: UTC+3 (Yemen Standard Time)

Rafsaqah is a village in eastern Yemen. It is located in the Hadhramaut Governorate.
